Claire Jude Demorest (born March 11, 1992) is an American actress and singer who is known for her roles in Dallas and Star.

Early life 
Demorest was born in Michigan, and grew up in a very religious family. She said in an interview  "I grew up in church, seven days a week. The service was very music-driven, so the pastor created a performing-arts school down the street. There was drama, dance, and choir rehearsal—it was my training."

At the age of 16, Demorest moved to Los Angeles to pursue an acting career. After trying everything from backup dancing to singing, she signed with Epic Records under producer L.A. Reid.

Career 
Demorest started her career in minor parts, as extras and background dancers in multiple shows and films prior to getting a shot in the 2009 short History of Made Up Things. She had a recurring role on Dallas where her character was killed off. During the summer of 2016, writer, director, and executive producer Lee Daniels held a nationwide search for Fox's girl-group series, Star (debuting December 14) ending in May 2019. "It was 10 auditions and Lee was part of every one," Demorest said.

Personal life 
Demorest married music producer Ammo on April 24, 2016. On September 4, 2018, Demorest announced via Instagram that she was pregnant. On November 11, 2018, she gave birth to their son. On June 14, 2021, she gave birth to their second son.

Filmography

Discography

Songwriting credits

References

External links 

Jude Demorest on Instagram

1992 births
Living people
Actresses from Detroit
Female models from Michigan
Singers from Detroit
Songwriters from Michigan
American women songwriters
21st-century American women singers
21st-century American singers